The 2022–23 Florida Panthers season is the 29th season for the National Hockey League franchise that was established in 1993. It is the Panthers' 24th season at FLA Live Arena. This will be the Panthers' first season under new head coach Paul Maurice.

Off-season
On June 22, 2022, Paul Maurice was named head coach following the departure of interim coach Andrew Brunette.

Standings

Divisional standings

Conference standings

Schedule and results

Preseason
The preseason schedule was published on June 30, 2022.

Regular Season
The regular season schedule was published on July 6, 2022.

Player statistics
As of February 20, 2023

Skaters

Goaltenders

Roster

Transactions
The Panthers have been involved in the following transactions during the 2022–23 season.

Key:

 Contract is entry-level.

 Contract initially takes effect in the 2023-24 season.

Trades

Notes:
 Calgary will receive Florida's 1st-round pick in 2026 instead if Florida's 1st-round pick in 2025 is within the top 2 selections.
 Florida will receive Calgary's 4th-round pick in 2026 instead if Florida's 1st-round pick in 2025 is within the top 2 selections.

Players acquired

Players lost

Signings

Draft picks

Below are the Florida Panthers' selections at the 2022 NHL Entry Draft, which will be held on July 7 and 8, 2022, at Bell Centre in Montreal.

Notes:
 The Florida Panthers' first-round pick will go to the Buffalo Sabres as the result of a trade on July 24, 2021, that sent Sam Reinhart to Florida in exchange for Devon Levi and this pick (being conditional at the time of the trade). The condition – Buffalo will receive a first-round pick in 2022 if Florida's first-round pick is outside of the top ten selections – was converted when the Panthers qualified for the 2022 Stanley Cup playoffs on April 3, 2022.
 The Florida Panthers' second-round pick will go to the Seattle Kraken as the result of a trade on March 16, 2022, that sent Calle Jarnkrok to Calgary in exchange for a third-round pick in 2023, a seventh-round pick in 2024 and this pick.
 The Toronto Maple Leafs' sixth-round pick went to the Florida Panthers as the result of a trade on March 21, 2022, that sent Tyler Inamoto to Columbus in exchange for Max Domi and this pick.
 The Pittsburgh Penguins' seventh-round pick will go to the Florida Panthers as the result of a trade on July 8, 2022, that sent a seventh-round pick in 2023 to Pittsburgh in exchange for this pick.

References

Florida Panthers seasons
Florida Panthers
Florida Panthers
Florida Panthers
Florida Panthers